Domangart Réti was king of Dál Riata in the early 6th century, following the death of his father, Fergus Mór.

He had at least two sons: Comgall and Gabrán, both of whom became kings in succession.  The Tripartite Life of St. Patrick states that he was present at the death of the saint, c. 493.  Domangart died around 507 and was succeeded by Comgall.

His byname, Réti, appears in Adomnán's Life of Saint Columba, in the form Corcu Réti, perhaps a synonym for Dál Riata. Corcu, a Primitive Irish language term for a kin group, usually combined with the name of a divine or mythical ancestor, is apparently similar to the term Dál. Alternatively, rather than representing an alternative name for all of Dál Riata, it has been suggested Corcu Réti was the name given to the kin group which later divided to form the Cenél nGabráin of Kintyre and the Cenél Comgaill of Cowal, thus excluding the Cenél nÓengusa of Islay and the Cenél Loairn of middle and northern Argyll.

See also
Origins of the Kingdom of Alba

References

Alan Anderson, ESSH
Marjorie Anderson, K&K
Bannerman, Studies
Fraser, Strangers
Sharpe, Adomnán

Further reading
 Eoin MacNeill, "Early Irish Population Groups: their nomenclature, classification and chronology", in Proceedings of the Royal Irish Academy (C) 29 (1911): 59–114

500s deaths
Kings of Dál Riata
6th-century Scottish monarchs
Year of birth unknown
6th-century Irish monarchs